Notre Dame Regional Secondary is a co-ed Catholic Secondary school, under the administration of Catholic Independent Schools Vancouver Archdiocese (CISVA) school board inn Canada. The school participates in sporting events under the name of the "Jugglers", with the team colours of Blue, White & Silver.

History 

In the 1950s, under the invitation of Archbishop William Mark Duke, The Sisters of Charity of Halifax accepted the challenge, to help finance a high school for the education of Catholic children in East Vancouver and Burnaby, and in 1953 Notre Dame Regional Secondary opened its doors for the first time.

In 1985, a young Irish priest, Fr. Joe Cuddy, was appointed as the Archbishop's Representative for the school. He immediately realized the need for an improved facility, and he created a three-phase plan for the rebuilding of the school. Although Fr. Joe Cuddy has since died, his dream is now in the 2nd phase of the building program.

On May 6, 2010, the doors opened for the new building. The structure has state of the art geothermal heating, photocell activated lighting and washrooms systems, Wi-Fi wireless connections, and SMART Board interactive whiteboards.

Independent school status 

Notre Dame Regional Secondary is classified as a Group 1 school under British Columbia's Independent School Act. It receives 50% funding from the Ministry of Education. The school receives no funding for capital costs. It is under charge of the Roman Catholic Archdiocese of Vancouver.

Notre Dame's Education Committee is made up of two elected representatives from each of the feeder parishes, and three pastors elected by the pastors of these parishes. One pastor is elected as Archbishop's Representative for the school.

Feeder Parishes 

Corpus Christi Elementary
Holy Cross Elementary
Parish of Immaculate Heart of Mary
St. Mary's Elementary
Parish of St. Theresa's
St. Francis of Assisi Elementary
St. Helen's Elementary
St. Jude's Elementary
Our Lady of Sorrows Elementary
Parish of Sacred Heart

Academic performance 

Notre Dame is ranked by the Fraser Institute. In 2013, it is ranked 61st out of 289 Vancouver, lower mainland schools.

98.1% of the students graduate and 85%+ of those students go on to study at colleges and universities across the country.

The school sponsors the Notre Dame Balsa Bridge Contest which is open to all Physics 11 & Physics 12 students.

The school courses are developed by the following departments: Business, Christian Education, English, Humanities, Information Technologies (IT), Languages, Mathematics, Performing Arts, Physical Education, Science, Social Studies, & Visual Arts.

Athletic performance 

The school competes in the following sports: Basketball, Cross Country, Field Hockey, Football, Golf, Soccer, Track & Field, Volleyball, & Wrestling.

Notre Dame is an associated member of BC school sports and has received championships from the association in:

Recently, Notre Dame has gone on to win high school championships in Soccer, Volleyball, Wrestling and Football.

The football program has traditionally ranked among the top teams in British Columbia.
 (pre 1975) Shrine Bowl Provincial Championships: Won 6 of 7 appearances
 (post 1975) Frank Gnup AAA Provincial Championships: Won 8 of 11 appearances

During the month of December, Notre Dame used to host the Christmas Classic Basketball Tournament in honour of the story "The Juggler of Notre Dame". But due to conflicts with 1st term exams, the school retired the tournament and replaced it with the Juggler Invitational Basketball Tournament which is open to Bantam, Junior Varsity & Varsity boys and girls teams, during the month of January.

Both the Varsity Boys and Girls basketball teams participate in the BC Catholic Basketball Championship, one of the largest tournaments in the province of BC.

Artistic performance 
Notre Dame provides students with a variety of performing and non-performing arts. The school provides the following productions in Drama Productions: Concert Band, Jazz Band, Show Choir, Concert Choir, Music, Dance Squad, Photography, Yearbook & Visual Arts.

The theatre has traditionally put on productions that have been a source of entertainment for the community and raised revenue for the Performing Arts at ND.

Clubs and committees 

Aside from the students of  the Principal's List (Academic achievement of 90%+), First Honour Roll (Academic achievement of 85%+), and Second Honor Roll (Academic achievement of 80%+) there are also the:
Ushers
Improv Club
Ski & Snowboard Club
Score-keepers Committee
Pro-life Club
Sacristy
Grad Committee
Newspaper Committee
Legion of Mary
Student Council
Yearbook Committee
Social Justice Club
Art Club
Service Club
Badminton Club

Notable alumni

Lui Passaglia, Punter/Kicker – Canadian Football League – BC Lions (Grey Cup 1985, 1994, & 2000)
Glen Clark – 31st Premier of British Columbia (1996–99)
Glen Jackson, Linebacker – Canadian Football League – BC Lions (Grey Cup 1985)
Lauren Diewold, Former Child Actress
John Malinosky, Offensive Linemen – Canadian Football League – Hamilton Tiger-Cats (Grey Cup 1986)
Al Cameron, Offensive linemen – Canadian Football League -
Leo Groenewegen, Offensive linemen – Canadian Football League – Ottawa Rough Riders, BC Lions & Edmonton Eskimos
Ante Milanovic-Litre, Running Back- Canadian Football League- Calgary Stampeders (Grey Cup 2018)

Notes 

Notre Dame is one of four, Vancouver, Catholic high schools;
the others being St. Patrick's Regional Secondary, Vancouver College and Little Flower Academy.

A permit was granted in February 2007, by Vancouver City Council for the right to build a new school facility on the old football practice field. The new building will consist of classrooms to accommodate 750 students. In July 2010, the old building was demolished to make way for Phase II.

References

External links 
 Notre Dame Regional Secondary
 Physics Balsa Bridge Building Contest
 Catholic Independent Schools of the Vancouver Archdiocese
 The Fraser Institute School Performance Report Cards
 BC High School Football

Catholic secondary schools in British Columbia
Private schools in British Columbia
High schools in Vancouver
Educational institutions established in 1953
1953 establishments in British Columbia